Sinaia railway station serves the Sinaia mountain resort in Romania. The first station was built in 1913 by the Demeter Cartner Company, and it was reserved exclusively for the Royal Family and its guests at Peleș Castle, generally foreign leaders.

Located on the railway line connecting Bucharest and Ploiești to Brașov and the rest of Transylvania, the train station serves the Căile Ferate Române lines 200, 300, and 400.

Memorials
On the station platform, there is a memorial plate marking the spot where Prime Minister Ion G. Duca was assassinated by the Iron Guard in 1933. A second memorial plaque was erected in 1999 to mark the celebrations then held to mark 120 years of the Ploiești to Brașov railway line.

New ceremonial station 
The second Ceremonial Railway Station is a short distance away from the first one, built following the plans of architect Duiliu Marcu in 1939.  It is designed in a modern Neoclassical style, featuring an arcaded porch on both sides, and is constructed of rustic random stone blocks. Originally displaying the Hohenzollern coat of arms, it has remained in use as a ceremonial station for state occasions and guests. Its single platform is continuous with platform 1 of the original (and now public) railway station. The building also featured a depot housing the Royal Train.

In front of the ceremonial station there is a large plaza designed with the purpose of holding official welcome ceremonies for various foreign leaders. The main room is decorated with a wall painting (5.50 meters x 5.50 meters) depicting a boar hunt of Prince Basarab I of Wallachia (eight life-size characters on horseback, alongside an inscription in Latin reading Basarab Voivode, 14th century).

The ceremonial station's purpose was retained during the communist regime. A presidential train brought American President Gerald Ford and Romanian President Nicolae Ceaușescu here on August 6, 1975. It is not open to the public.

Exhibitions
The main (original) railway station has a large booking hall, and extensive offices. In addition the northern part of the station building has been developed into a model railway exhibition, which is open to the public most days, and some static exhibits of railway memorabilia have been placed on the platform beyond the model exhibition. These include a 230 series 4-6-0 steam locomotive number 230.039 (displayed with the tender of sister engine 230.050), and a motor car converted for railway track inspection duties, with flanged wheels fitted.

Gallery 
All photos were taken before 2010. The station was reconstructed between 2009 and 2011.

References

Railway stations opened in 1913
Sinaia
Railway stations in Romania
Buildings and structures in Prahova County
1913 establishments in Romania